Grieco is an Italian surname. Notable people with the surname include:

 Andrea Grieco (born 1991), football player
 Gaetano Grieco (born 1982), footballer
 Joseph Grieco, political scientist
 Joseph V. Grieco (1915–2006), politician
 Paul Grieco, organic chemist:
 Grieco elimination
 Grieco three-component condensation
 Richard Grieco (born 1965), actor
 Rose Grieco (1915-1995), American writer
 Ruggero Grieco (1893–1955), politician
 Sergio Grieco (1917-1982), film director
 Vito Grieco (born 1971), footballer

See also
 Greco (disambiguation)

Italian-language surnames
Italian toponymic surnames
Ethnonymic surnames